Unicenter may refer to:

 CA Unicenter, a software suite
 Unicenter (shopping), a large mall and entertainment complex in Greater Buenos Aires, Argentina